Floss is an unincorporated community in Boston Township in southwestern Washington County, Arkansas, United States. The community is located on Cove Creek. Odell is to the southwest and Strickler lies to the northeast.

References

Unincorporated communities in Washington County, Arkansas
Unincorporated communities in Arkansas